Rachel Morningstar Hoffman (December 17, 1984 – May 7, 2008) was a 23-year-old Florida State University graduate who was murdered while acting as a police informant in a botched drug sting that started on May 7, 2008. Her body was recovered two days later near Perry, Florida.

Sting operation and death
Hoffman was under drug court supervision for possession of 25 g (0.9 oz.) of cannabis discovered during a traffic stop on February 22, 2007.  On April 17, 2008,  Tallahassee, Florida police searched her apartment and uncovered another 151.7 g (5.328 oz.) of cannabis, and four ecstasy pills. 

Hoffman faced a possible prison sentence if charged and convicted on criminal charges related to the discovered drugs. Police attempted to persuade her to identify other marijuana dealers to avoid the charges. She refused.  The police then pressured her to act as a confidential informant in a drug sting operation instead in exchange for not being charged with additional drug charges. The purported goal of the operation was to buy 1,500 ecstasy pills, 2 oz. of cocaine, and two handguns, which was contrary to department policy, using $13,000 cash in a buy–bust operation.  Hoffman's family stated that all three buys were very out-of-character for her.

Two narcotics officers arranged for the drug buy at a specific location and were providing security for the buy. That was later deemed to be insufficient manpower to protect the informant and still apprehend the suspects.

While she was at the drug buy, with the policemen monitoring, the two suspects changed the location of the buy.  She was informed not to follow the suspects to the new location, but technical issues prevented her from actually receiving the instructions. Her police handlers lost track of her when she agreed with the suspects to change the plans and left the buy spot with the two suspects in their stolen silver BMW. While in transit, the two suspects allegedly executed her with the gun she was supposed to buy.

Murder investigation and sentencing
According to police documents, a witness described seeing the BMW stuck in a ditch, with a 2005 Volvo belonging to Hoffman idling nearby, between 7 pm and 7:30 pm, about 30 minutes after the police lost track of Hoffman. The witness claimed that the BMW drove off when he stopped to help the driver try to get the car out of the ditch, but the vehicle later returned as the witness was leaving. The witness claimed he became suspicious and decided to leave when the driver of the Volvo opened the trunk and revealed a camouflage blanket and neat stacks of female clothing.

Deneilo R. Bradshaw, 23, and Andrea Jabbar Green, 25, who were fired from their jobs at a window tint and car detailing shop just days before the incident, were charged with armed robbery in connection with the events leading up to Hoffman's death.

The Tallahassee Police Department admitted that Hoffman had no training to work undercover, she did not know the two men targeted in the sting, and she had no experience with cocaine or firearms and very little with MDMA. The officers involved in the operation were suspended with pay, and the family filed a wrongful death lawsuit against the city.

The two sellers were charged by a grand jury with first degree murder. Details of the murder itself were not released at the time.

Hoffman's story garnered many news headlines including a page on the Tallahassee Democrat website dedicated to information surrounding her death.
20/20 covered the story on July 25, 2008, and Dateline NBC covered it on January 16, 2009.

On December 17, 2009, which would have been Hoffman's 25th birthday, Bradshaw, one of the murder suspects, was found guilty of first-degree murder with robbery and sentenced to life imprisonment without parole plus 30 years (concurrent). Green was also convicted of Hoffman's murder and sentenced to life in prison.

Rachel's Law 
On May 7, 2009, a law (dubbed "Rachel's Law") was passed by the Florida State Senate, which brought into effect on July 1, 2009 a number of requirements for law enforcement agencies in Florida regarding the use of police informants. While Rachel's Law became statewide policy for all police departments, at least one major city department began taking steps towards training on the new policies at least three months sooner than required.

"Rachel's Law" requires law enforcement agencies to provide special training for officers who recruit confidential informants, instruct informants that reduced sentences may not be provided in exchange for their work, and permit informants to request a lawyer if they want one.

See also

Death of Andrew Sadek, a confidential informant for police in North Dakota

References

External links
Rachel Morningstar Foundation website
Bear Creek Article Tribute

Deaths by firearm in Florida
2008 murders in the United States
2008 in Florida
May 2008 events in the United States